Alina Kalistratova (born 6 November 1996) is a Ukrainian sprinter. She competed in the women's 4 × 100 metres relay at the 2017 World Championships in Athletics.

References

External links

1996 births
Living people
Ukrainian female sprinters
World Athletics Championships athletes for Ukraine
Place of birth missing (living people)